= 2028 United States presidential election in Texas =

United States presidential election in Texas

The 2028 United States presidential election in Texas is scheduled to take place on Tuesday, November 7, 2028, as part of the 2028 United States elections in which all 50 states plus the District of Columbia will participate. Texas voters will choose electors to represent them in the Electoral College via a popular vote. The state of Texas has 40 electoral votes in the Electoral College, following reapportionment due to the 2020 United States census in which the state gained two seats
